Equi Terme is a part of the Italian comune Fivizzano, in the province of Massa and Carrara, in Tuscany.

Frazioni of the Province of Massa-Carrara